Al-Arabi may refer to:

Companies
Al-Arabi Group, a holding company in the Kuwait Stock Exchange#Services
Al Arabi Investment Group (AB Invest), a subsidiary of Arab Bank
Al Arabi Investment Group Company, a subsidiary of Arab Bank

Media
Al Ahram Al Arabi, an Arabic political weekly magazine published in Egypt since 1997
 Al Arabi, a weekly newspaper in Egypt 
Al-Arabi, a pan-Arab magazine published in Kuwait since 1958
Al Araby (TV channel), a pan-Arab television network from London
Al-Araby Al-Jadeed, a pan-Arab media outlet in London
Al Quds Al Arabi, a pan-Arab daily newspaper published in London since 1989

People
Mahdi al-Arabi, is a Libyan Brigadier-General and deputy chief of staff during the 2011 Libyan civil war
Nabil Elaraby or Nabil al-Arabi (born 1935), an Egyptian diplomat who was Secretary-General of the Arab League from 2011 to 2016
Sulayman al-Arabi, Wali (governor) of Barcelona and Girona in the year 777
Youssef El-Arabi or Youssef Al-Arabi (born 1987), a professional footballer

Sports
Mohammed Bin Hamad AlHitmi Indoor Hall or Al-Arabi Indoor Hall, a multi-purpose arena in Doha, Qatar

Qatar
Al Arabi Qatar (volleyball), a professional volleyball team based in Doha
Al-Arabi FC (Qatar) Reserves, the reserves soccer team for Al-Arabi Qatar
Al Arabi Qatar (handball), based in Doha
Al-Arabi SC (Qatar), a multi-sports club founded in 1952
Al-Arabi SC basketball, a professional basketball team based in Doha

Saudi Arabia
Al-Arabi (Saudi Arabia), a multi-sports club based in Unaizah, Al-Qassim, and founded in 1958
Al-Arabi (Saudi Arabia, basketball club), based in Unaizah, Al Qassim
Al-Arabi (Saudi Arabia, handball club), based in Unaizah, Al Qassim

Other countries
Al-Arabi (Bahraini football club)
Al-Arabi (Jordan), a football club based in Irbid and founded in 1945
Al-Arabi SC (Kuwait), a multi-sports club based in Mansuriya and founded in 1953
Al-Arabi SC (Syria), a football club based in As-Suwayda and founded in 1972
Al-Arabi (UAE), a football club based in Umm Al Quwain
Al Shabab (Dubai) or Al Shabab Al Arabi Club, merged with Dubai CSC in 2017 to form Shabab Al-Ahli Dubai FC

Other uses
Al-Arabi (encyclopedia), a printed Arabic encyclopedia
Al-Arabi, a version of Code page ASMO449+, the 7-bit character set used to encode the Arabic language

See also
Arabi (disambiguation)
Araby (disambiguation)